Tarana Assembly constituency is one of the 230 assembly constituencies of Madhya Pradesh a central Indian state. Tarana is also part of Ujjain Lok Sabha constituency.

Members of Legislative Assembly

 1962: M. Singh, Indian National Congress
 1967: M. Singh, Bharatiya Jana Sangh
 1972: Lakshminarayan Jain, Indian National Congress
 1977: Nagulal Malviya, Janata Party
 1980: Durga Prasad Suryavanshi, Indian National Congress (I)
 1985: Durga Prasad Suryavanshi, Indian National Congress
 1990: Govind Parmar, Bharatiya Janata Party
 1995: Madhav Prasad Shastri, Bharatiya Janata Party
 1998: Babulal Malviya, Indian National Congress
 2003: Tarachand Goyal, Bharatiya Janata Party
 2008: Rodmal Rathore, Bharatiya Janata Party
 2013: Anil Firojiya, Bharatiya Janata Party
 2018: Mahesh Parmar, Indian National Congress

See also

 Ujjain
 Tarana
 Ujjain (Lok Sabha constituency)

References

Assembly constituencies of Madhya Pradesh
Politics of Ujjain